Social Science Association may refer to:

National Association for the Promotion of Social Science founded 1857 in the United Kingdom
American Social Science Association founded 1865
The Social Science Association of Harold Walsby and other socialists working on systematic ideology, active 1944 to 1956